Tachys scutellaris  is a very small ground beetle found in salt marshes.

References

Trechinae
Beetles described in 1828